Sequoyah Bay State Park is on the western shore of Fort Gibson Lake in Wagoner County, Oklahoma. It offers several campgrounds, each named for a notable chief of the Five Civilized Tribes. These include: Chief Attacullaculla, Cherokee; Chief Pushmataha, Choctaw; Chief Osceola, Seminole; Chief Opothleyahola, Creek; and Chief Payamataha, Chickasaw.

The park contains  and 367 sites for recreational vehicles or tents.

References

Protected areas of Wagoner County, Oklahoma
State parks of Oklahoma